Ulster Irish is the variety of Irish spoken in the province of Ulster. It "occupies a central position in the Gaelic world made up of Ireland, Scotland and the Isle of Man". Ulster Irish thus has much in common with Scottish Gaelic and Manx. Within Ulster there have historically been two main sub-dialects: West Ulster and East Ulster. The Western dialect is spoken in County Donegal and once was in parts of neighbouring counties, hence the name Donegal Irish. The Eastern dialect was spoken in most of the rest of Ulster and northern parts of counties Louth and Meath.

History
Ulster Irish was the main language spoken in Ulster from the earliest recorded times even before Ireland became a jurisdiction in the 1300s. Since the Plantation, Ulster Irish was steadily and forcibly replaced by English. The Eastern dialect died out in the 20th century, but the Western lives on in the Gaeltacht region of County Donegal. In 1808, County Down natives William Neilson and Patrick Lynch (Pádraig Ó Loingsigh) published a detailed study on Ulster Irish. Both Neilson and his father were Ulster-speaking Presbyterian ministers. When the recommendations of the first Comisiún na Gaeltachta were drawn up in 1926, there were regions qualifying for Gaeltacht recognition in the Sperrins and the northern Glens of Antrim and Rathlin Island. The report also makes note of small pockets of Irish speakers in northwest County Cavan, southeast County Monaghan, and the far south of County Armagh. However, these small pockets vanished early in the 20th century while Ulster Irish in the Sperrins survived until the 1950s and in the Glens of Antrim until the 1970s. The last native speaker of Rathlin Irish died in 1985.

Lexicon
The Ulster dialect contains many words not used in other dialects—of which the main ones are Connacht Irish and Munster Irish—or used otherwise only in northeast Connacht. The standard form of written Irish is now An Caighdeán Oifigiúil. In other cases, a semantic shift has resulted in quite different meanings attaching to the same word in Ulster Irish and in other dialects. Some of these words include:

 is used to mean "to think" as well as "to make" or "to do", síleann, ceapann and cuimhníonn is used in other dialects, as well as in Ulster Irish.
 "opinion", southern tuairim - in Ulster, tuairim is most typically used in the meaning "approximate value", such as tuairim an ama sin "about that time". Note the typically Ulster derivatives barúlach and inbharúla "of the opinion (that...)".
Scottish Gaelic , Manx ), and  "way"). Note that  alone is used as a preposition meaning "towards" (literally meaning "in the way of":  = "he looked towards the sea"). In the sense "road", Ulster Irish often uses bealach mór ("big road") even for roads that aren't particularly big or wide.
, "when?" (Connacht ; Munster)
, "what is?"
, "cabbage" (southern ; Scottish Gaelic )
, "weir" (Connacht , standard )
, "I hear" (southern , but  is also attested in South Tipperary and is also used in Achill and Erris in North and West Mayo). In fact, the initial c- tends to be lenited even when it is not preceded by any particle (this is because there was a leniting particle in Classical Irish:  yielded  in Ulster)
, "hard"-as in difficult (southern ),  "tough"
, "close" (southern and western ; in other dialects  means "to move in relation to or away from something", thus  = to shirk,  = to close in) although druid is also used in Achill and Erris
, "cattle" (southern  = "one head of cattle", beithígh = "cattle", "beasts")
, "wings" (southern )
, "lazy" (southern and western ,  = "false, treacherous") although falsa is also used in Achill and Erris
, "seagull" (standard )
, "also" (standard  )
, "gate" (standard )
, "short" (southern )
, "calf" (southern  and ) although gamhain is also used in Achill and Erris
, "boy" (southern ;  means "child" in Connemara)
, "girl" (southern  and )
, "busy" (standard )
, an adjective meaning "some" or "certain" is used instead of the southern .  also means "certain" or "particular".
 is used to mean "I hear, perceive" as well as "I feel" (standard ) but  generally refers to stories or events. The only other place where mothaím is used in this context is in the Irish of Dún Caocháin and Ceathrú Thaidhg in Erris but it was a common usage throughout most of northern and eastern Mayo, Sligo, Leitrim and North Roscommon
, "daughter" (standard ; Scottish Gaelic )
, "news" (standard , but note that even Connemara has nuaíocht)
, "soap" (standard , Connemara )
, "youth", "young man", "boyfriend" (Southern = "gangly, young lad")
 is used to mean "I can" as opposed to the standard  or the southern .  is also a preferred Ulster variant. Tig liom and its derivatives are also commonly used in the Irish of Joyce Country, Achill and Erris
the word  "wonderful" is used as an intensifier instead of the prefix  used in other dialects.

Words generally associated with the now dead East Ulster Irish include:
 (feel, hear, perceive) - but also known in more southern Irish dialects
, more standardized ársaigh (tell) - but note the expression ag ársaí téamaí "telling stories, spinning yearns" used by the modern Ulster writer Séamus Ó Grianna.
 (evening)
, more standardized spelling corraí (anger)
 (sore)
 (yet)
 (cow)
 (hurry)
 (house)
 (duck)

In other cases, a semantic shift has resulted in quite different meanings attaching to the same word in Ulster Irish and in other dialects. Some of these words include:

 "head" (southern and western ; elsewhere,  is used to mean "skull")
 "mare" (southern and western ; elsewhere,  means "horse")

Phonology
The phonemic inventory of Ulster Irish (based on the dialect of Gweedore) is as shown in the following chart (see International Phonetic Alphabet for an explanation of the symbols). Symbols appearing in the upper half of each row are velarized (traditionally called "broad" consonants) while those in the bottom half are palatalized ("slender"). The consonants  are neither broad nor slender.

The vowels of Ulster Irish are as shown on the following chart. These positions are only approximate, as vowels are strongly influenced by the palatalization and velarization of surrounding consonants.

The long vowels have short allophones in unstressed syllables and before .

In addition, Ulster has the diphthongs .

Some characteristics of the phonology of Ulster Irish that distinguish it from the other dialects are:
  is always the approximant . No dialect makes a phonemic contrast between the approximant and the fricative, however.
  is realised .
 Unstressed long vowels are shortened but not reduces to a schwa like unstressed short vowel.
This happens in Connacht and Scottish Gaelic as well.
- in unstressed syllables is always  (this includes verb forms), as it is in the Scottish Gaelic dialect of Cowal and most of Sutherland.
 According to Ó Dochartaigh (1987), the loss of final schwa "is a well-attested feature of Ulster Irish". This has led to words like  being pronounced .

Differences between the Western and Eastern sub-dialects of Ulster included the following:
In West Ulster and most of Ireland, the vowel written  is pronounced  (e.g.  ), but in East Ulster it was pronounced  (e.g.   as it is in Scottish Gaelic. J. J. Kneen comments that Scottish Gaelic and Manx generally follow the East Ulster pronunciation.
In East Ulster,  in the middle of a word tended to vanish and leave one long syllable. William Neilson wrote that this happens "in most of the counties of Ulster, and the east of Leinster".
In East Ulster,  at the end of words (as in ) tended to be much weaker, e.g.  may be pronounced  and  pronounced . Neilson wrote that this is found "in all the country along the sea coast, from Derry to Waterford".
However, broad  may become  in the middle of a word (for example in  "book").

Morphology

Initial mutations

Ulster Irish has the same two initial mutations, lenition and eclipsis, as the other two dialects and the standard language, and mostly uses them the same way. There is, however, one exception: in Ulster, a dative singular noun after the definite article is lenited (e.g.  "on the tree") (as is the case in Scottish and Manx), whereas in Connacht and Munster, it is eclipsed, except in the case of den, don and insan, where lenition occurs in literary language. Both possibilities are allowed for in the standard language.

Verbs

Irish verbs are characterized by having a mixture of analytic forms (where information about person is provided by a pronoun) and synthetic forms (where information about number is provided in an ending on the verb) in their conjugation. In Ulster and North Connacht the analytic forms are used in a variety of forms where the standard language has synthetic forms, e.g.  "we praise" (standard ,  being a back formation from the verbal ending  and not found in the Munster dialect, which retains  as the first person plural pronoun as do Scottish Gaelic and Manx) or  "they would praise" (standard ). The synthetic forms, including those no longer emphasised in the standard language, may be used in short answers to questions.

"I will bless" (standard  ).

Some irregular verbs have different forms in Ulster from those in the standard language. For example:
  (independent form only) "I do, make" (standard ) and  "I did, made" (standard rinne mé)
   (independent form only) "I see" (standard , Southern chím, cím (independent form only))
  "I give" (standard , southern bheirim (independent only)),  or  "I do not give" (standard only ), and / "I will give" (standard , southern bhéarfad(independent form only))
  (independent form only) "I get" (standard ),  "I do not get"
  "I say, speak" (standard ,  "I do not say, speak", although  is used to mean "I say" in a more general sense.)

Particles
The form is more common in the north of the Donegal Gaeltacht.  cannot be followed by the future tense: where it has a future meaning, it is followed by the habitual present. In some dialects however (Gweedore), cha eclipses all consonants, except b- in the forms of the verb "to be", and sometimes f-:

In the Past Tense, some irregular verbs are lenited/eclipsed in the Interrogative/Negative that differ from the standard, due to the various particles that may be preferred:

Syntax
The Ulster dialect uses the present tense of the subjunctive mood in certain cases where other dialects prefer to use the future indicative:

Sit down here by my side, Séimí, till I give you some advice and tell you my story.

The verbal noun can be used in subordinate clauses with a subject different from that of the main clause:

I would like you to go there.

Notable speakers

Some notable Irish singers who sing songs in the Ulster Irish dialect include Maighread Ní Dhomhnaill, Mairéad Ní Mhaonaigh, Róise Mhic Ghrianna, and Pádraigín Ní Uallacháin.

Notable Ulster Irish writers include Micí Mac Gabhann, Seosamh Mac Grianna, Peadar Toner Mac Fhionnlaoich, Cosslett Ó Cuinn, Niall Ó Dónaill, Séamus Ó Grianna, Brian Ó Nualláin, Colette Ní Ghallchóir and Cathal Ó Searcaigh.

See also 
Ulster Scots dialects
Mid Ulster English
Scottish Gaelic
Irish language in Northern Ireland

References

Bibliography

 (book & 2 CDs in the Ulster dialect)
 (book & 2 CDs in Ulster dislect)

Literature

 [folklore, Arranmore Island]

 [folklore, Ranafast]
 [novel, the Rosses]
 [novel, the Rosses]
 [novel, the Rosses]

 [local history, Gweedore]

 [autobiography, Ulster]
 [folklore, East Ulster: Antrim, Rathlin Island]
 [Kilcar]
 [essays, the Rosses]
 [novel, the Rosses]
 [unfinished novel, the Rosses]
 [autobiography, the Rosses]

 [folklore]
 [short stories]
 [short stories]
 [essays]

 [autobiography, Inishowen]

 [legends, Tyrconnell]
 [history, folklore, memoirs, the Rosses]

 [short stories, the Rosses]
 [life story, the Rosses]
 [biography, essays, the Rosses]
 [biography, the Rosses]
 [local tradition, the Rosses]

 [short stories, the Rosses]
 [travel book]

 [folklore, Gweedore]
 [folklore, Gweedore]

 [memoirs and local history, Tory Island/Magheroarty]
 [folklore, Tír Eoghain]

 [biography, folklore, the Rosses]
 [local history, the Rosses]
 [mythology, the Rosses]

 [novel]
 [the Rosses]
 [short stories, the Rosses]
 [novel, the Rosses]
 [autobiography, the Rosses]
 [short stories, the Rosses]
 [novel, the Rosses]
 [short stories the Rosses]
 [novel, the Rosses]
 [short stories, the Rosses]
 [novel, the Rosses]
 [the Rosses]

 [Kilcar]

 [folklore]

 [travel book, Gortahork]
 [mythology, the Rosses]
 [the Rosses]

 [local history, the Rosses]

External links

Gaelic resources focusing on Ulster Irish 
A yahoogroup for learners of Ulster Irish 
Oideas Gael (based in Glencolmcille)
The Spoken Irish of Rann na Feirste

Irish dialects
Ulster
Languages of Northern Ireland